Rabdophaga albipennis is a gall midge which forms galls on the shoots of white willow (Salix alba).

Description
The gall is a slight swelling on a twig just below a bud on white willow (Salix alba). Inside the gall is a reddish-orange larvae which later makes an emergence hole in the twig or bud and overwinters in the gall.

Distribution
The insect or gall has been found in Great Britain and Italy.

References

albipennis
Nematoceran flies of Europe
Gall-inducing insects
Insects described in 1850
Taxa named by Hermann Loew
Willow galls